Lebzino is a rural locality (a village) in Novlenskoye Rural Settlement, Vologodsky District, Vologda Oblast, Russia. The population was 21 as of 2002.

Geography 
Lebzino is located 92 km northwest of Vologda (the district's administrative centre) by road. Mikhalevo is the nearest rural locality.

References 

Rural localities in Vologodsky District